This Dream of You is the fifteenth studio album by Canadian singer Diana Krall, released on September 25, 2020, by Verve Records. The album spawned two singles released in August 2020.

Background
The album is named after Krall's rendition of the Bob Dylan song from his album Together Through Life (2009). The release is a collection of Krall's scores of studio recordings that she performed with her longtime producer Tommy LiPuma before his death in 2017. The dozen tracks were selected from over 30 recordings that the pair had laid down. The album was finished in May 2020 and produced by Krall herself. The "Autumn in New York" video was created to raise awareness for New York Cares, the largest volunteer organization in New York City founded in 1987.

Critical reception

At Metacritic, which assigns a normalized rating out of 100 to reviews from mainstream critics, the album received an average score of 71, based on four reviews, which indicates "generally favorable reviews".

Stephen Thomas Erlewine of AllMusic wrote, "This Dream of You winds up shining a light on the accomplishment of the final album Krall and LiPuma finished in his lifetime. Together, they knew which songs to select to create a complete listen. What remained behind is nice but not quite absorbing." Sebastian Scotney, in his review for The Arts Desk, stated, "Whereas Turn Up The Quiet contained the very best of Krall's sessions in the years before Lipuma passed away, This Dream of You [...], presenting the also-rans, is quite simply not as good... This disappointing album feels like quite the wrong way to be setting the seal on the Krall/LiPuma years. It is to be hoped that she can and will bounce back from it." Glide Magazine Jim Hynes mentioned, "As one who has many Krall albums, this will undoubtedly satisfy her listeners who came aboard as she was building her career playing standards and those who enjoyed her past two efforts. This Dream of You is a solid entry, though surely not the strongest in her storied catalog."

Lee Zimmerman of American Songwriter observed, "Credit Diana Krall with doing what she does best on her sumptuous new album, This Dream of You, a collection of (mostly) classic covers rendered in her distinctive signature sensual style. All hushed smoky vocals, subtle orchestration and arrangements and, of course, her exquisite and articulate piano playing, it shares its nocturnal ambiance and late night caress in an intimate but expressive manner, one that would befit a supper club setting." Steve Futterman, in his review for The New Yorker, wrote, "Diana Krall's new album is a waiting game. For much of its length, the understated singer offers up congenial readings of Great American Songbook warhorses, relying on the fixed intimacy of her trademark breathy and oh-so-careful vocal style."

Track listing

Personnel
Credits adapted from the liner notes of This Dream of You.

Musicians

 Diana Krall – piano ; vocals 
 John Clayton Jr. – bass 
 Jeff Hamilton – drums 
 Anthony Wilson – guitar 
 Vanessa Freebairn-Smith – cello solo ; cello 
 Christian McBride – bass 
 Russell Malone – guitar 
 Alan Broadbent – piano ; orchestral arrangements 
 Tony Garnier – bass 
 Karriem Riggins – drums 
 Marc Ribot – guitar 
 Stuart Duncan – fiddle 
 Randall Krall – accordion 
 Joel Derouin – concertmaster 
 Charlie Bisharat, Mario DeLeon, Kevin Connolly, Neel Hammond, Tamara Hatwan, Natalie Leggett, Songa Lee, Katia Popov, Michele Richards, Kathleen Sloan, Marcy Dicterow Vaj, Ina Veli, John Wittenberg – violins 
 Andrew Duckles, Kathryn Reddish, Colleen Sugata, Mike Whitson – violas 
 Jodi Burnett, Alisha Bauer, Jeniffer Kuhn – celli

Technical

 Diana Krall – production
 Tommy LiPuma – production
 Al Schmitt – mixing ; recording 
 Steve Genewick – engineering assistance, Pro Tools editing
 Chandler Harrod – engineering assistance
 Brian Montgomery – recording 
 Chris Potter – recording 
 Eric Boulanger – mastering
 Shari Sutcliffe – production coordination
 Olivia Guerino – production coordination
 Chie Imaizumi – copyist
 Terry Woodson – copyist

Artwork
 Coco Shinomiya – design
 Mr. Fotheringham – label illustration

Charts

Weekly charts

Year-end charts

Notes

References

External links
 

2020 albums
Albums produced by Tommy LiPuma
Albums recorded at Capitol Studios
Covers albums
Diana Krall albums
Verve Records albums